The Honda CR250R was a Honda racing dirt bike. The prototype was built in 1971, but it was not until late 1972 that production of the 1973 model "out of the box racers" began sale to the general public. The CR250 was produced for nearly 37 years, 2007 being the final year of production.

In 1997, Honda produced an industry first, an aluminum chassis for a motocross motorcycle. These 'first gen' frames were thick, rigid, and were a big change from the previous steel frames, where flexibility had been seen as a problem in the early years. The 1997-8 engines were equipped with a new stator, which supplied DC voltage for the new Keihin carburetor with an electronic 'Power Jet' system, in efforts to control lean mixture preignition. Included in the new electrics was a capacitor and a rectifier/regulator. The 1999 model was almost identical but the Power Jet had disappeared. 

For 2000, the 'second gen' aluminum frame was less rigid, with thinner twin-spars, providing a rigidity decrease and better handling. The Keihin PWK carburetor replaced earlier PJ models. The CDI box limited RPMs to 8000. The 2001 model was nearly identical, with a change to a different CDI box, adding 500 RPM to the redline where two more horsepower lurked. The new Mikuni TMX carburetor proved to be temperamental to weather changes. 

For 2002, Honda ended the outstanding interchangeability that had existed from 1992~2001, when 
a completely new engine arrived with a change from cylinder reed induction to an engine case reed induction system and an electronically controlled, cable operated RC valve in place of the centrifugally operated exhaust valve system used since 1992. A TPS (Throttle Position Sensor) was added to the carburetor, powered by a new stator. The ECM would now be able to retard ignition timing to preclude preignition, though there was no ping sensor anywhere. 

The third & final generation of the CR250 aluminum chassis also made its appearance, which was thinner, with better flex properties. The same engine & chassis, with minor suspension & plastics changes, continued on until production of this 2-stroke stopped in 2007. Although the case reed engine has potentially the best design, it was never developed to its full potential by Honda, as the industry attention rapidly turned to four stroke engine development. Many owners of the final generation of the CR250 felt the need to turn to the aftermarket to bring that engine to its full potential. The 2001 models continue to be savored by lovers of the CR250, considered the best of the best ever produced.

Notes

CR250R
Motorcycles introduced in 1973
Two-stroke motorcycles